Baluta may refer to:
 A village in Ponoarele Commune, Mehedinți County, Romania
Baluta (autobiography), by Data Pawar
Alexandru Băluță (born 1993), a Romanian footballer
Tudor Băluță (born 1999), a Romanian footballer